The second elections to Zetland County Council were held in November 1892 as part of the wider 1892 local elections. According to The Shetland Times, the elections attracted little interest. The council had twenty five seats, and 21 of these were uncontested. Seven of the unopposed councillors were new, whilst the seats of Walls South and Fetlar saw no candidates coming forward. The four seats contested were North Unst, Tingwall, Delting North, and Dunrossness.

The new council was dominated by members of Lerwick's middle class, with nine merchants, four ministers, and three solicitors. Only three councillors; Bruce, Gifford, and A J Hay, represented landed interests.

Results
Candidates with an asterisk were returned incumbents.

Dunrossness

Unst North

References

1892
1892 Scottish local elections
19th century in Shetland
November 1892 events